Stesilea tuberculata is a species of beetle in the family Cerambycidae. It was described by Anton Nonfried in 1894.

References

Pteropliini
Beetles described in 1894